Jan Chodkiewicz might refer to these nobles in the Grand Duchy of Lithuania:

 Jan Hieronimowicz Chodkiewicz (1537–1579), elder of Samogitia, Grand Marshal of Lithuania
 Jan Karol Chodkiewicz (1560–1621), famous military commander
 Jan Kazimierz Chodkiewicz  (1616–1660), castellan of Vilnius
 Ivan Chodkiewicz (ca. 1420–1484), voivode of Kiev, ancestor of the Chodkiewicz family